Quincy Boogers (born 28 December 1995) is a Dutch former football player who last played for FC Dordrecht.

Club career
He made his professional debut in the Eredivisie for FC Dordrecht on 17 May 2015 in a game against AFC Ajax.

References

External links
 

1995 births
Footballers from Dordrecht
Living people
Dutch footballers
FC Dordrecht players
Eredivisie players
Eerste Divisie players
Association football midfielders